Nicolai Jacob Marstrand (5 August 1770 – 12 July 1829) was a Danish mechanician and inventor. He was the father of painter Wilhelm Marstrand.

Early life and education
Marstrand was born on 5 August 1776 in Østerdalen, Norway, the son of manager (bergskriver) of Inset Copperworks Even Nicolai Marstrand (1723–85) and Magdalene Elisabeth Schnitler (1730–1802). The family moved to Trondheim when his father died in 1785. He graduated from Trondheim Cathedral School in 1789.

Career
Aged  20, Marstrand came to Denmark, where he initially worked odd jobs, for instance as a private tutor and a road assistant, before being employed as an assistant under colonel Eilert Tscherning at Frederick's Works. He was later promoted to mechanical consultant to the government, settling in Copenhagen in 1806. He was the following year sent to England but when the war broke out shortly thereafter he came under suspicion of being a spy and had to flee the country.

Back in Copenhagen, he was granted a royal privilege as a baker after inventing a kneading machine, opening a bakery in Silkegade in 1810. He also established a mechanical workshop, constructing spinning machines and various musical instruments, especially harps. He invented an oil press in 1812 and in 1813 was granted a monopoly on a horse mill. In 1827, he invented a machine for copying of sculptures.

Marstrand was from 1808 also inspector of the workshops at the Royal Institute for the Deaf and Mute. In 1813, he was appointed as manager of the workshops at Forbedringshuset.

Personal life
 
Marstrand married Petra Ottilia Smith (28 February 1778 – 15 November 1847), a daughter of provost Troels S. (1744–1823) and Anna Agnete Plum (1752–1805), on 26 September 1804 in Holbæk. Five of their seven children survived childhood: Naval officer Osvald J. Marstrand, plantation owner Otto Marstrand, baker and politician Troels Marstrand, painter Wilhelm Marstrand and toolmaker Tgeodor Marstrand.

Marstrand's home was a meeting place for many notable artists and writers of the time. Once a week, he hosted a quartet in which he played the violin and the painter C. W. Eckersberg played cello.

In 1809, he was awarded Dannebrogordenens Hæderstegn. In 1811 he was appointed as Kommerceråd. He died on 12 July 1829 and is buried in Assistens Cemetery.

References

External links
 Nicolai Jacob Marstrand at geni.com

18th-century Danish inventors
Danish musical instrument makers
Danish mechanical engineers
Danish bakers
Norwegian emigrants to Denmark
Burials at Assistens Cemetery (Copenhagen)
Marstrand family
1770 births
1829 deaths
19th-century Danish inventors